George P. Dempsey (July 19, 1929 – October 7, 2017) was an American professional basketball player.

Born in Philadelphia, Dempsey moved to Merchantville, New Jersey and played for the 1947 Merchantville High School team that won the New Jersey Group II state championship.

Dempsey played as a guard for The King's College for five seasons from 1954 to 1959. He then played in the National Basketball Association as a member of the Philadelphia Warriors and Syracuse Nationals. He averaged 5.0 points per game in his career and won a league championship with Philadelphia in 1956.

Dempsey was a resident of Pennsauken Township, New Jersey until his death in 2017.

References

External links

1929 births
2017 deaths
American men's basketball players
Basketball players from New Jersey
College men's basketball players in the United States
People from Merchantville, New Jersey
People from Pennsauken Township, New Jersey
Philadelphia Warriors draft picks
Philadelphia Warriors players
Point guards
Sportspeople from Camden County, New Jersey
Syracuse Nationals players
The King's College (New York City) alumni
Basketball players from Philadelphia